Jürgen Thorwald (born Heinz Bongartz, October 28, 1915; died April 4, 2006) was a German writer, journalist and historian known for his works describing the history of forensic medicine and of World War II.

Thorwald was a native of Solingen, Rhenish Prussia, and attended the University of Cologne. He started his career in 1933 in Nazi Germany, writing for publications such as Die Braune Post ("The Brown Mail"), the SS journal Das Schwarze Korps ("The Black Corps") and the NSDAP paper National-Zeitung. During the war he worked as a propaganda writer, focusing on the Luftwaffe, Kriegsmarine and the general German war effort.

After the war he used the pseudonym Jürgen Thorwald in order to be able to work under allied occupation. In 1947 he legally adopted the new name.

Thorwald’s book The Century of the Detective was nominated for the Edgar Allan Poe Award in 1966 in Best Fact Crime category but he lost to Truman Capote's  In Cold Blood. In 1984 he was awarded the Order of Merit of the Federal Republic of Germany. Thorwald died in Lugano.

Bibliography
 Luftmacht Deutschland. Luftwaffe, Industrie, Luftfahrt, 1939 (preface by Hermann Göring)
Die große Flucht - published originally as two books, later as one or two, English language title Defeat in the East: Russia Conquers-January to May 1945, originally published as Flight in the Winter. 
 Es begann an der Weichsel, 1948 
 Das Ende an der Elbe, 1950
 Die ungeklärten Fälle, 1950
 Wen sie verderben wollen..., 1952
 Der Fall Pastorius, 1953
 Blut der Könige. Das Drama der Bluterkrankheit in den europäischen Fürstenhäusern, 1954
 Das Jahrhundert der Chirurgen, 1956 (The Century of the Surgeon)
 Das Weltreich der Chirurgen, 1958 (The Triumph of Surgery) 
 Die Entlassung. Das Ende des Chirurgen Ferdinand Sauerbruch, 1960 (The dismissal: The Last Days of Ferdinand Sauerbruch)
 Macht und Geheimnis der frühen Ärzte, 1962
 Das Jahrhundert der Detektive, 1964 (Century of the Detective: Volume 1 in English "The Marks of Cain" (1965), Volume 2 "Dead Men Tell Tales" (1966))
 Die Stunde der Detektive. Werden und Welten der Kriminalistik, 1966
 Macht und Geheimnis der frühen Ärzte, 1967
 Die Traum-Oase, 1968
 Die Patienten, 1971 (The Patients)
 Die Illusion. Rotarmisten in Hitlers Heeren, 1974 (The Illusion: Soviet Soldiers in Hitler's Armies)
 Das Gewürz. Die Saga der Juden in Amerika, 1978
 Im zerbrechlichen Haus der Seele. Ein Jahrhundert der Gehirnchirurgen, der Gehirnforscher, der Seelensucher, 1986
 Die Monteverdi-Mission Droemer Knaur, München 1989, Neufassung: Juli 1998
 Der geplagte Mann. Die Prostata - Geschichte und Geschichten, 1994

References

1915 births
2006 deaths
Officers Crosses of the Order of Merit of the Federal Republic of Germany
People from Solingen
People from the Rhine Province
University of Cologne alumni
German male writers
German non-fiction writers
Nazi propagandists